Tetracha lanei is a species of tiger beetle that was described by Lane in 1943, but under a name that was preoccupied, so it was renamed by Mandl in 1961; it is endemic to São Paulo, Brazil.

References

Beetles described in 1943
Endemic fauna of Brazil
Beetles of South America
Cicindelidae